Garnier is a division of the L'Oréal Group which sells hair care products. 

Garnier may also refer to:

Companies
 Garnier Liqueur de Paris et Enghien, a 19th and 20th century French liqueur manufacturer famous for its four-chamber bottles and vast menagerie of decorative, collectible figurine decanters.

People
 Garnier de Nablus, Master of the Knights Hospitalier, commander under Richard I in the Third Crusade
 Garnier (writer), also known as Warner (fl. 1106), English writer of homilies, and a monk of Westminster
 Garnier (surname)

Places
 Palais Garnier, or Paris Opéra, an opera house in Paris, France